Italo Henrique Juvino da Silva (born January 25, 1991 in Recife), simply known as Italo, is a Brazilian footballer who plays as left back for Afogados. He already played for national competitions such as Copa do Brasil and Campeonato Brasileiro Série D.

Career statistics

References

External links

1991 births
Living people
Brazilian footballers
Association football forwards
Campeonato Brasileiro Série D players
Esporte Clube São João da Barra players
Sportspeople from Recife